Samper may refer to:

Samper (surname)
Samper de Calanda, a town in the province of Teruel, Aragon
Samper del Salz, a town in the province of Zaragoza, Aragon